Vigneronia is a genus of lichen-forming fungi in the family Roccellaceae. It has five species. The genus was circumscribed in 2014 by Damien Ernst, with Vigneronia spieri assigned as the type species. This species, originally described as Schismatomma spieri from collections made in the Galápagos Islands, has since been recorded from mainland Ecuador and the Antilles (Curaçao). The genus is named after Ernst's wife, Nathalie Vigneron, who accompanied him on collecting trips.

Vigneronia lichens are crustose, and have a smooth, thin, thallus lacking a cortex. The photobiont partner is trentepohlioid. Lichen products identified from members of the genus include roccellic acid, erythrin, and gyrophoric acid. The ascomata are in the form of elongated,   measuring 0.5–4 by 0.3–1 mm in diameter.

Species
 Vigneronia caceresiana  – Brazil
 Vigneronia cypressi  – Florida; French West Indies
 Vigneronia mexicana  – Mexico
 Vigneronia robustula  – Chile
 Vigneronia spieri  – Galápagos Islands; Ecuador; Antilles

References

Roccellaceae
Taxa described in 2014
Lichen genera